Doyle is a rural small town in Lassen County, California. The ZIP Code is 96109. The community is inside area code 530. It is located within a census-designated place named after the town, while the population of the town itself was not given. Its population is 536 as of the 2020 census, down from 678 from the 2010 census.

History
Oscar Doyle settled at the site in the 1870s and donated land for the town. The first post office at Doyle opened in 1908. The town lost 33 homes in the Beckwourth Complex Fire in July 2021.

Geography
According to the United States Census Bureau, the CDP has a total area of 6.1 square miles (15.8 km), over 99% of which is land.

Climate
Doyle has a warm-summer Mediterranean climate (Csb), according to the Köppen climate classification system. Due to its relative aridity, it nearly qualifies as having a steppe climate (BSk).

Demographics
The 2010 United States Census reported that Doyle had a population of 678. The racial makeup of Doyle was 583 (86.0%) White, 14 (2.1%) African American, 37 (5.5%) Native American, 3 (0.4%) Asian, 2 (0.3%) Pacific Islander, 12 (1.8%) from other races, and 27 (4.0%) from two or more races. Hispanic or Latino of any race were 55 persons (8.1%).

The Census reported that 678 people (100% of the population) lived in households, 0 (0%) lived in non-institutionalized group quarters, and 0 (0%) were institutionalized.

There were 261 households, out of which 81 (31.0%) had children under the age of 18 living in them, 125 (47.9%) were opposite-sex married couples living together, 36 (13.8%) had a female householder with no husband present, 20 (7.7%) had a male householder with no wife present.  There were 28 (10.7%) unmarried opposite-sex partnerships, and 1 (0.4%) same-sex married couples or partnerships; 68 households (26.1%) were made up of individuals, and 20 (7.7%) had someone living alone who was 65 years of age or older. The average household size was 2.60.  There were 181 families (69.3% of all households); the average family size was 3.02.

The population age range was spread out, with 157 people (23.2%) under the age of 18, 49 people (7.2%) aged 18 to 24, 159 people (23.5%) aged 25 to 44, 227 people (33.5%) aged 45 to 64, and 86 people (12.7%) who were 65 years of age or older.  The median age was 41.6 years. For every 100 females, there were 104.2 males.  For every 100 females age 18 and over, there were 101.2 males.

The homeowner vacancy rate was 6.8%; the rental vacancy rate was 10.8%.  448 people (66.1% of the population) lived in owner-occupied housing units and 230 people (33.9%) lived in rental housing units.

Politics

References

Census-designated places in California
Census-designated places in Lassen County, California